Back to Mine: Talvin Singh is the eighth volume of the Back to Mine series of albums. It represents English DJ Talvin Singh's contribution to the collection.

Track listing

References

Talvin Singh albums
2001 compilation albums
Singh, Talvin